Ardozyga caminopis is a species of moth in the family Gelechiidae. It was described by Edward Meyrick in 1904. It is found in Australia, where it has been recorded from New South Wales.

The forewings are dark bronzy, irrorated with blackish. The costal edge is ochreous-whitish just beyond the middle and there is an irregular-edged elongate whitish-ochreous spot extending along the dorsum from two-fifths to three-fourths. The hindwings are tawny, deeper towards the apex.

References

Ardozyga
Moths described in 1904
Taxa named by Edward Meyrick
Moths of Australia